Yongin Samsung Life Blueminx is a South Korean women's basketball club, based in Yongin. They have been a member of the WKBL (Women's Korean Basketball League) since its inception. Originally based in Suwon, they are now located in Yongin, Gyeonggi-do.

Honours

Women's Korean Basketball League 

WKBL Championship
 Winners (6): 1998 (summer), 1999 (summer), 2000 (winter), 2001 (winter), 2006 (summer), 2020–21
 Runners-up (12): 2002 (summer), 2003 (winter), 2003 (summer), 2004 (winter), 2005 (winter), 2007 (winter), 2007–08, 2008–09, 2009–10, 2012–13, 2016–17, 2018–19

WKBL Regular Season
 Winners (6): 1998 (summer), 1999 (summer), 2000 (winter), 2002 (summer), 2003 (summer), 2004 (winter)

References

External links
 Official website 
 Asia-Basket.com profile

Basketball teams in South Korea
Basketball teams established in 1977
Women's basketball teams in South Korea
Women's Korean Basketball League teams
Sport in Gyeonggi Province
Samsung Sports
Cheil Worldwide
1977 establishments in South Korea
Sport in Suwon
Sport in Yongin